The Anglo-Swedish Literary Foundation is a fund for the development of cultural relations between the UK and Sweden. The fund was founded in 1927 by George Bernard Shaw with his Nobel Prize in Literature in 1925 as a basis. Administered by Swedish officials, its main expenditure is literary translation from Swedish into English.

References

External links
 Anglo-Swedish Literary Foundation, Swedish Embassy in the United Kingdom

Foundations based in England
Sweden–United Kingdom relations
1927 establishments in Sweden
1927 establishments in the United Kingdom
Organizations established in 1927
George Bernard Shaw
Literary translation
Translations into English
Swedish literature